Henry Polson (19 November 1907 – 09 July 1992) was a Scotland international rugby union player.

Rugby Union career

Amateur career

He played for Gala.

Provincial career

He was picked for the South of Scotland District against South Africa on 31 October 1931.

International career

He was capped once for Scotland in 1930.

References

1907 births
1992 deaths
Scottish rugby union players
Scotland international rugby union players
Gala RFC players
South of Scotland District (rugby union) players
Rugby union flankers